Metarbela taifensis is a moth in the family Cossidae. It is found in Saudi Arabia.

References

Natural History Museum Lepidoptera generic names catalog

Metarbelinae
Moths described in 1988